Jentink's dormouse (Graphiurus crassicaudatus) is a species of rodent in the family Gliridae. It is found in Cameroon, Ivory Coast, Ghana, Liberia, Nigeria, and Togo, and  possibly Benin, Equatorial Guinea, and Sierra Leone. Its natural habitat is subtropical or tropical, moist lowland forests.

References
 Grubb, P. & Schlitter, D. 2004.  Graphiurus crassicaudatus.   2006 IUCN Red List of Threatened Species.   Downloaded on 29 July 2007.
Holden, M. E.. 2005. Family Gliridae. pp. 819–841 in Mammal Species of the World a Taxonomic and Geographic Reference. D. E. Wilson and D. M. Reeder eds. Johns Hopkins University Press, Baltimore.

Graphiurus
Mammals described in 1888
Taxonomy articles created by Polbot